East Bend Township is one of twelve townships in Yadkin County, North Carolina, United States. The township had a population of 3,383 according to the 2000 census.

Geographically, East Bend Township occupies  in northeastern Yadkin County.  East Bend Township's northern and eastern borders are formed by the Yadkin River.  The only incorporated municipality within East Bend Township is the Town of East Bend.

Townships in Yadkin County, North Carolina
Townships in North Carolina